These are the official results of the Women's Triple Jump event at the 1996 Summer Olympics in Atlanta, Georgia. There were a total number of 31 competitors, with one non-starter.

It took 14.22m to get into the final. The key players from the previous year's world championships which had rewritten the record books were all in attendance. World record holder Inessa Kravets put out a long first jump, but it wasn't measured as it was ruled a foul. The first round leader was Ren Ruiping with a 14.30m. The only other jumper over 14 meters in the first round was Sheila Hudson at 14.02m. The second round advanced the distances significantly. Inna Lasovskaya jumped 14.98m to take a commanding lead. Ashia Hansen jumped her best of the day 14.49m to pull into second, but in total, five women jumped over 14.40m in the second round. In the third round Šárka Kašpárková equalled Lasovskaya with a 14.98m and with a 14.45m in the second round, Kašpárková held the tiebreaker. Iva Prandzheva and Kravets both produced 14.84m's in the round to play in bronze medal territory, with Kravets holding the tiebreaker 14.40m from the second round. In the fourth round Lasovskaya and Kašpárková continued to spar, first Lasovskaya jumping 14.66m to take the tiebreaker edge, answered by Kašpárková's 14.69m. Prandzheva jumped 14.39m but still never got into third place. The fifth round settled the medals as Lasovskaya jumped 14.70m to edge ahead on the tiebreaker.

Iva Prandzheva from Bulgaria, ranking 4th with 14.92, was disqualified because of doping.

Medalists

Results

Qualification
Qualification Rules: Qualifying performance 14.20 (Q) or at least 12 best performers (q) advance to the Final.

Final

See also
 1995 women's World Championships triple jump
 1997 women's World Championships triple jump

References

External links
 Official Report
 Results

T
Triple jump at the Olympics
1996 in women's athletics
Women's events at the 1996 Summer Olympics